Women's Super G World Cup 2004/2005

Final point standings

In Women's Super G World Cup 2004/05 all results count.

 Note: In the last race only the best racers were allowed to compete and only the best 15 finishers were awarded with points.

External links
 

World Cup
FIS Alpine Ski World Cup women's Super-G discipline titles